Princess Frederica of Hanover (Friederike Sophie Marie Henriette Amelie Therese; 9 January 1848 – 16 October 1926) was a member of the House of Hanover. After her marriage, she lived mostly in England, where she was a prominent member of society.

Early life
Frederica was born 9 January 1848 in Hanover, the elder daughter of the Hereditary Prince of Hanover (later King George V of Hanover) and of his wife, Princess Marie of Saxe-Altenburg.  She held the title of Princess with the style Her Royal Highness in Hanover. In the United Kingdom, she held the title of Princess with the style Her Highness as a male-line great-granddaughter of King George III. She was known as "Lily" within her family.

In January 1866, the Prime Minister of Prussia Otto von Bismarck began negotiations with Hanover, represented by Count Adolf Ludwig von Platen-Hallermund, regarding the possible marriage of Frederica to Prince Albrecht of Prussia. These plans came to nothing as tensions grew between Hanover and Prussia finally resulting in the Austro-Prussian War (14 June – 23 August 1866).

In 1866, Frederica's father was deposed as King of Hanover.  Eventually, the family settled at Gmunden in Austria, where they owned Schloss Cumberland (named for the British Ducal title held by Frederica's father). Frederica visited England with her family in May 1876, and again, after her father's death, in June 1878.

Marriage
Frederica was courted by her second cousin, Prince Leopold, Duke of Albany (with whom she later became lifelong friends and confidantes), and by Alexander, Prince of Orange. Frederica, however, was in love with Baron Alfons von Pawel-Rammingen (1843–1932), the son of a government official of the Duchy of Saxe-Coburg and Gotha. Alfons had served as an equerry to Frederica's father.  Alfons was naturalised as a British subject on 19 March 1880 and, on 24 April 1880, he and Frederica were married.  The wedding took place in at St George's Chapel, Windsor Castle, performed by the Bishop of Oxford. Alfons' sister Anna was married to Freiherr Baron Oswald von Coburg (1822-1904), the son of an illegitimate son of Prince Ludwig Karl Friedrich of  Saxe-Coburg-Saalfeld (third son of Ernest Frederick, Duke of Saxe-Coburg-Saalfeld).

Alfred Tennyson, the Poet Laureate, wrote a quatrain in honour of Frederica's marriage, focusing on her relationship to her blind father, who had died two years before:

O you that were eyes and light to the King till he passed away
From the darkness of life —
He saw not his daughter — he blest her: the blind King sees you to-day,
He blesses the wife.

After their marriage Frederica and Alfons lived in an apartment at Hampton Court Palace. The apartment was in the south-west wing of the west front of the palace in the suite formerly called the "Lady Housekeeper's Lodgings".  Frederica and Alfons had one daughter who was born and died at Hampton Court Palace:
 Victoria Georgina Beatrice Maud Anne von Pawel-Rammingen (7 March 1881 – 27 March 1881). She was buried in the Albert Memorial Chapel in St George's Chapel at Windsor Castle.

Frederica and Alfons were frequent guests at Windsor Castle and at Osborne House.

Charitable works
Frederica was involved with numerous charitable activities.

In August 1881 she established the Convalescent Home, an institution for poor women who have given birth but have been discharged from maternity hospitals. Because her father had been blind, she was a benefactress of the Royal Normal College and Academy of Music for the Blind at Upper Norwood.

Frederica was interested in children and became patron of the Church Extension Association, then based in Kilburn, which wished to set up schools in Willesden, then a new suburb of London. On 24 July 1889 she opened Princess Frederica School in Kensal Rise.

She was also patron of the Training College for Teachers of the Deaf at Ealing, of the Strolling Players' Amateur Orchestral Society, of the Hampton Court and Dittons Regatta of the Home for Foreign Governesses, of the Mission to the French in London, and of the Royal Society for the Prevention of Cruelty to Animals.  She was President of the Middlesex Branch of SSFA (Soldiers' and Sailors' Families Association).

Later life and death
Frederica and Alfons gave up their apartment at Hampton Court Palace in 1898.  While they continued to live part of the year in England, they subsequently spent more time in Biarritz in France where they had previously vacationed.  They owned Villa Mouriscot there.

Frederica died in 1926 at Biarritz. She was buried in the Royal Vault in St George's Chapel at Windsor Castle. Her will was sealed in London in 1927. Her estate was valued at £85 (or £3,700 in 2022 when adjusted for inflation). In 1927 a window in her memory was unveiled in the English Church in Biarritz.

Ancestry

References

British princesses
Hanoverian princesses
1848 births
1926 deaths
House of Hanover
Nobility from Hanover
People associated with the Royal National College for the Blind
German baronesses
Burials at St George's Chapel, Windsor Castle
Daughters of kings